State Road 15 (NM 15) is a state highway in the US state of New Mexico. NM 15's southern terminus is in the village of Silver City at U.S. Route 180 (US 180), and the  northern terminus is a dead end by Cliff Dweller Canyon which is near Gila Cliff Dwellings National Monument.

Major intersections

See also

References

015
Transportation in Grant County, New Mexico
Transportation in Catron County, New Mexico